Joseph Michael Kramer (born June 21, 1950) is an American musician best known as the drummer of the hard rock band Aerosmith, which was inducted to the Rock and Roll Hall of Fame in 2001.

Life and career
Kramer was born in the Bronx, New York City, the son of Doris and Mickey Kramer, a businessman. He is Jewish and received a bar mitzvah.  

In the early 1970s, Kramer was a member of The Institution, a seminal New Jersey garage band founded by Philip Rubin, J. Howard Duff, Richie Lester, and Marv Coopersmith. On Nov. 25, 1970, the early Bruce Springsteen band, Steel Mill, opened for The Institution at Newark State College.

Aerosmith
Kramer is credited with originating the name Aerosmith. In his memoir, Kramer revealed that he idly conceived the name Aerosmith while listening to Harry Nilsson's album Aerial Ballet in 1968, two years before the band was formed. Kramer insists that there is no connection between the name "Aerosmith" and Sinclair Lewis' novel Arrowsmith. Shortly before joining Aerosmith, Kramer moved to Boston and was attending Berklee College of Music and worked with Chubby & the Turnpikes (later to be known as Tavares) alongside Bernie Worrell.

Kramer's memoir, Hit Hard: A Story of Hitting Rock Bottom at the Top, was released on June 30, 2009.

Kramer made a guest appearance in the 22nd season (2010–11) of The Simpsons, in the episode "The Ned-Liest Catch", as a former partner of Bart's teacher Mrs. Krabappel, as told in the third-season episode "Flaming Moe's. In 2015, NECA released a "Simpsons-ized" action figure of Kramer, as well as the other members of Aerosmith, as part of the fourth series in the company's Simpsons 25th Anniversary collectible figure line.

Personal life 
In 2013, Kramer announced a partnership with Comfort Foods, Inc. to roast, package and distribute his whole bean, organic coffee line: Rockin’ & Roastin’ Coffee. In 2015, he  announced a business partnership with Les Otten, the former vice chairman of the Boston Red Sox, to open two Joey Kramer's Rockin’ & Roastin’ Café and Restaurant locations in Newry, Maine, at the foot of the Sunday River Ski Resort; and North Attleborough, Massachusetts. The Newry location closed in 2016. The North Attleborough location closed in 2017.

Kramer's second wife, Linda, died on June 22, 2022, at age 55.

Aerosmith songs written
The following Aerosmith songs have a writing credit given to Kramer:
 "Pandora's Box" from Get Your Wings
 "Kings and Queens" from Draw the Line
 "The Hand That Feeds" from Draw the Line
 "The Hop" from Done With Mirrors
 "The Movie" from Permanent Vacation
 "Krawhitham" from Pandora's Box
 "Beautiful" from Music from Another Dimension!
 "Lover Alot" from Music from Another Dimension!
 "Can't Stop Lovin' You" from Music from Another Dimension!
 "Closer" from Music from Another Dimension!

Equipment

Kramer currently endorses Pearl drums, Zildjian cymbals and sticks (including his own signature model), plus Remo heads.  He has also used many other brands of drums including Ludwig with whom he was closely associated with for much of his career up until switching to Pearl.  In the past he has also used sets by Fibes, Tama and DW.

Drums
Pearl Crystal Beat series drums: 
 24"x18" bass drum 
 13"x10" mounted tom 
 16"x16" floor tom 
 18"x16" floor tom 
 14"x6.5" UltraCast snare

Cymbals: Avedis Zildjian: 
 15" A Custom rezo hi-hats 
 19" A Custom projection crash 
 20" A crash/ride 
 21" A mega bell bell ride 
 14" A Custom mastersound hi-hats 
 19" K Custom hybrid china

Sticks: Zildjian Joey Kramer signature sticks in green dip

See also
Joey Kramer Hit Hard (2010)

References

External links

 Joeykramer.com
 Rockinandroastin.com
 Rockinandroastinrestaurant.com

1950 births
Aerosmith members
American rock musicians
American heavy metal drummers
Living people
People from the Bronx
Musicians from New York City
American rock drummers
20th-century American drummers
American male drummers
Glam metal musicians
Blues rock musicians
Jewish heavy metal musicians